Anusak Laosangthai (born January 5, 1992) is a Thai professional footballer who plays as a forward.

International career

He won the 2007 AFF U-17 Youth Championship with Thailand U17

International Goals

Under-16

Honours

International
Thailand U-16
 AFF U-16 Youth Championship: 2007

External links
 Profile at Goal
https://us.soccerway.com/players/anusak-laosangthai/440246/

1992 births
Living people
Anusak Laosangthai
Anusak Laosangthai
Association football forwards
Anusak Laosangthai
Anusak Laosangthai
Anusak Laosangthai
Anusak Laosangthai
Anusak Laosangthai
Anusak Laosangthai
Anusak Laosangthai
Anusak Laosangthai
Anusak Laosangthai
Anusak Laosangthai
Anusak Laosangthai